John J. Long was an American college basketball coach. He was the head basketball coach at Catholic University of America in 1943-44. He coached Catholic to a 17–7 record and berth in the 1944 NCAA basketball tournament.  Longwas an athlete at Catholic, playing basketball from 1925 to 1928.  He was inducted into the Catholic athletics Hall of Fame in 1977.

Head coaching record

References

Date of birth unknown
Date of death unknown
American men's basketball coaches
American men's basketball players
Catholic University Cardinals men's basketball coaches
Catholic University Cardinals men's basketball players